NAAB is the National Architectural Accrediting Board of the United States.

Naab is a river in Germany.

Naab or NAAB may also refer to:
NAAB (gene)
Na`ab, village in Yemen
 (1885–1935), monk and resistance fighter in Dahn, Germany